Family traditions are attitudes and ideals inherited from one's parents.

Family Tradition may also refer to:
Family Tradition (album), by Hank Williams, Jr. (1979)
"Family Tradition" (Hank Williams, Jr. song)
"Family Tradition" (Senses Fail song)
"Family Tradition", an episode of The Wild Thornberrys